Green Springs Mountain is a summit in the U.S. state of Oregon.

Green Springs Mountain was named for the characteristic green foliage around a mountain spring.

References

Mountains of Jackson County, Oregon
Mountains of Oregon